Bronwyn Thompson (born 28 January 1973) is an Australian rower who competed at the 1996 Atlanta and 2000 Sydney Olympics in the women's eight. She attended Ballarat Grammar from 1985 to 1990.

References

External links
Profile at Australian Olympic Committee

1973 births
Living people
Australian female rowers
Olympic rowers of Australia
Rowers at the 1996 Summer Olympics
Rowers at the 2000 Summer Olympics
Sportspeople from Ballarat